Add-e Sovadi (also known as ‘Ad-e Savāri) is a village in Abdoliyeh-ye Gharbi Rural District, in the Central District of Ramshir County, Khuzestan Province, Iran. At the 2006 census, its population was 274, in 41 families.

References 

Populated places in Ramshir County